Oskar Leo Leino (21 April 1900 – 21 June 1988), known as Leo Leino, was a Finnish athlete who competed at the 1924 Summer Olympics. He was a pentathlete and gained a total of 23 points in the final.

References

Finnish decathletes
Athletes (track and field) at the 1924 Summer Olympics
Olympic athletes of Finland
1900 births
1988 deaths
Finnish pentathletes